Columbia Wagon Works, also known as Colonial Wagon Company, is a historic wagon factory complex located at Columbia in Lancaster County, Pennsylvania. The complex was built between 1889 and 1920, and includes seven contributing buildings.  They are rectangular brick factory buildings with heavy timber frame construction.  Six of the buildings are arranged in an "H"-shape.  The buildings range in height from one to 3 1/2-stories. The wagon company closed in 1926, after which the buildings housed a tobacco warehouse operated by the American Cigarette & Cigar Company and produce warehouses.  Between 1994 and 1996, the complex was converted to house 60 apartments.

It was listed on the National Register of Historic Places in 2001.

See also 
 Wisconsin Wagon Company Factory

References 

Industrial buildings and structures on the National Register of Historic Places in Pennsylvania
Industrial buildings completed in 1920
Buildings and structures in Lancaster County, Pennsylvania
Wagons
National Register of Historic Places in Lancaster County, Pennsylvania
Tobacco buildings in the United States